Fred Ho (born Fred Wei-han Houn; August 10, 1957 – April 12, 2014) was an American jazz baritone saxophonist, composer, bandleader, playwright, writer and Marxist social activist.

Biography
He was born in Palo Alto, California, and moved at the age of six with his family to Massachusetts. In 1988, he changed his surname to "Ho".

While he is sometimes associated with the Asian-American jazz or avant-garde jazz movements, Ho himself was opposed to the use of term "jazz" to describe traditional African-American music because the word "jazz" had sometimes been used pejoratively by white Americans to denigrate the music of African Americans.

Ho sought to define what constitutes Asian-American jazz: "What makes Chinese American music Chinese American? What would comprise an Asian American musical content and form that could transform American music in general rather than simply be subsumed in one or another American musical genre such as 'jazz'?" He polemicized against "the white assimilationist notion of the petty bourgeois Asian American artist that anything by an Asian American artist makes it Asian American," pointing out that, for instance, "Yo-Yo Ma is a cellist who happens to be Chinese/Asian American, not a Chinese/Asian American musician."

In his role as an activist, many of his works fuse the melodies of indigenous and traditional Asian and African forms of music. He envisioned his music to be a real synthesis: "In opposing cultural imperialism, a genuine multicultural synthesis embodies revolutionary internationalism in music: rather than co-opting different cultures, musicians and composers achieve revolutionary transformation predicated upon anti-imperialism in terms of both musical respect and integrity as well as a practical political economic commitment to equality between peoples."

Ho also co-edited four books: Sounding Off! Music as Subversion/Resistance/Revolution (1996), Legacy to Liberation:  Politics and Culture of Revolutionary Asian Pacific America (2001), Afro Asia: Revolutionary Political and Cultural Connections between African Americans and Asian Americans (2008), and Maroon the Implacable: The Collected Writings of Russell Maroon Shoatz (2013). Ho's contributions to the Asian-American empowerment movement are varied and many. He is credited with co-founding several Asian-American civic groups such as the East Coast Asian Students Union (while a student at Harvard), the Asian American Arts Alliance in New York City, the Asian American Resource Center in Boston and the Asian Improv record label.

Of Chinese descent, Ho specialized in the combining sometimes asynchronous tunes and melodies of various musical traditions, creating what many have described as both brilliant and chaotic sounds. He was the first to combine Chinese opera with traditional African-American music. He led the Afro Asian Music Ensemble (founded in 1982) and the Monkey Orchestra (founded in 1980). He lived in Greenpoint, Brooklyn, New York.

Ho held a B.A. degree in sociology from Harvard University (1979). He recorded for the Koch Jazz and Soul Note labels. Some of his final works include Deadly She-Wolf Assassin at Armageddon, which premiered in Philadelphia, Pennsylvania, in June 2006,  and Voice of the Dragon I, II, and III. As Ho was a prolific composer, writer, playwright, his list of works grew continually. Some of his first CDs include Monkey I, Monkey II, The Underground Railroad to My Heart (Soul Note), We Refuse To Be Used And Abused, and Tomorrow is Now! 

In his 2000 book, Legacy to Liberation, Ho, recapitulating an aesthetic vision first presented in 1985, wrote:

On August 4, 2006, Ho was diagnosed with colon cancer. After chemotherapy, his health improved, but a second tumor was found on September 24, 2007. He wrote two books about cancer: Diary of a Radical Cancer Warrior: Fighting Cancer and Capitalism at the Cellular Level (2011), and Raw Extreme Manifesto: Change Your Body, Change Your Mind and Change the World While Spending Almost Nothing! (2012). He received numerous grants, including from the National Endowment for the Arts and the Rockefeller Foundation, and among the honours accorded him were a 1996 American Book Award, a Guggenheim Fellowship, in 2009 the Harvard Arts Medal, and in March 2014 (almost 1 month before his death) the Harlem Arts Festival Lynette Velasco Community Impact Award. At the 17th Annual Black Musicians Conference, Ho received the Duke Ellington Distinguished Artist Lifetime Achievement Award, which he was the youngest person to achieve. Ho died on April 12, 2014, aged 56, at his home in Brooklyn, New York.

Discography

 1985: Tomorrow is Now (Soul Note)
 1985: Bamboo That Snaps Back (Finnadar)
 1987: We Refuse to be Used and Abused (Soul Note)
 1988: A Song for Manong (Asian Improv)
 1993: The Underground Railroad to My Heart (Soul Note)
 1996: Monkey Part I (Koch Jazz)
 1997: Monkey Part II (Koch Jazz)
 1997: Turn Pain Into Power (O.O. Discs)
 1998: Yes Means Yes, No Means No, Whatever She Wears, Wherever She Goes (Koch)
 1999: Warrior Sisters (Koch)
 2001: Once Upon a Time in Chinese America (Innova)
 2009: Celestial Green Monster (Mutable Music)
 2011: Year of the Tiger (Innova)
 2011: Snake-Eaters (Big Red Media)
 2011: The Sweet Science Suite: A Scientific Soul Music Honoring of Muhammad Ali (Big Red Media)

With the Julius Hemphill Sextet
Five Chord Stud (Black Saint, 1994)

Books edited by Ho
Sakolsky, Ron, and Fred Ho. Sounding Off! Music as Subversion/Resistance/Revolution. Brooklyn, NY: Autonomedia, 1996.
Ho, Fred. Legacy to Liberation:  Politics and Culture of Revolutionary Asian Pacific America. Oakland, CA: AK Press, 2001.
Ho, Fred and Bill V. Mullen. Afro Asia: Revolutionary Political and Cultural Connections between African Americans and Asian Americans. Durham, NC: Duke University Press, 2008.

Books about Ho
Fujino, Diane C., ed. Wicked Theory, Naked Practice: A Fred Ho Reader. Minneapolis, MN: University of Minnesota Press, 2009.
Buckley, Roger N., and Tamara Roberts, ed. Yellow Power, Yellow Soul: The Radical Art of Fred Ho (Asian American Experience). Champaign, IL: University of Illinois Press, 2013.

See also

References

External links

 Discover Fred Ho, a Transmedia Project Featuring the Documentary, Fred Ho's Last Year, discoverfredho.org; accessed April 14, 2014. 
 Big Red Media, Inc. website; accessed April 14, 2014.
 Fred Ho papers, lib.uconn.edu; accessed April 14, 2014.
 Voice of the Dragon website; accessed April 14, 2014.
 ; accessed April 14, 2014.
 Fred Ho manuscript scores, performance programs, and other material, 1991-2011 at Isham Memorial Library, Harvard University

Avant-garde jazz musicians
1957 births
2014 deaths
American activists
American Marxists
American dramatists and playwrights of Chinese descent
American musicians of Chinese descent
American writers of Chinese descent
American jazz composers
American male jazz composers
American jazz baritone saxophonists
Harvard University alumni
Marxist writers
Musicians from Palo Alto, California
Deaths from cancer in New York (state)
Deaths from colorectal cancer
20th-century American dramatists and playwrights
American Book Award winners
Jazz musicians from California